Min'an is a subdistrict and the county seat of Longshan in Hunan, China. The subdistrict is located in the northwest of the county, it is bordered by Laifeng County of Hubei province to the west, Huatang and Xinglong Subdistricts to the nort and Xiluo Town to the east and south. The seat of local government is at Xiang'e Rd.().

See also 
 List of township-level divisions of Hunan

References

Longshan County
County seats in Hunan
Subdistricts of Hunan